YurView Louisiana (previously Cox 4) is an American local cable-only public, educational, and government access (PEG) cable TV station in Baton Rouge, New Orleans, and Lafayette owned by Cox Communications. It first signed on as Cox 4 in 2001. In February 2017, Cox rebranded the channel as YurView Louisiana and began offering the channel in HD.

The station airs three local high school football games, televised live, in its "Cox 4 Game of the Week."   There are also programs that discuss academic and athletic issues associated with LSU and Southern University. In addition to local sports, it also carries coverage of the American Athletic Conference.

References

Television stations in Baton Rouge, Louisiana
Television stations in Louisiana
American public access television
Cox Communications